Narar village is located in Kaithal Tehsil of Kaithal district in Haryana, India. As per constitution of India and Panchyati Raaj Act, Narar village is administrated by Sarpanch (Head of Village) who is elected representative of village.

Most of the people are Jats .

Demographics
Most of the population of the village is Jat and widely spoken language is Haryanvi.

Schools
 Govt. Sr. Secondary Sechool, Narar
 N.A. Sr. Sec. School, Narar

Transportation
The nearby Railway stations to Narar village are New Kaithal Halt Railway station (NKLE), Kaithal Railway station (KLE) and Geong Railway station (GXG).

From Kaithal bus stand, bus services are also available to Delhi, Hisar, Chandigarh, Jammu and many other places.

References 

Villages in Kaithal district